

The Broadmeadows Valley Trail is a shared use path for cyclists and pedestrians in the outer northern suburbs of Melbourne, Victoria, Australia.

Following the path
The north end of the trail is most readily accessed from Craigieburn railway station. The trail starts at the intersection of Stockton Street and Aitken Creek close to the station.

Follow Aitken Creek for 1.8 km until you reach the back entrance gate of the Craigieburn Public Golf course. Rather than continuing through the golf course along Aitken Creek, proceed in a southerly direction via Axminster Drv. It soon forms a path made out of the ends of a series of cull de sacs. About a 1 km from Aitken Creek a small wetland appears. Follow the trail here until a large solitary palm comes into view. Head for the palm, then continue along a short goat track on its far side, that crosses a narrow easement. Pick up the path on the other side of the easement.

Now in Roxburgh Park, the path winds round some streets and crosses an open section and then runs between some contemporary terrace like houses. It breaks into an open park area, where the path forms a figure of eight. At the south end of the park, it passes through a distinct line of trees running west east and crosses a large power transmission line easement. While possible, do not go east at this point. Continue in a southerly direction.

From here the path runs for another 8 km through a section that is easy to navigate and arrives at Barry Rd in Westmeadows. Passing by a couple of ovals on the left, the path reaches a footbridge about 0.4 km from Barry Rd. Cross the bridge and arrive at the Moonee Ponds Creek Trail.

Connections
The electrified railway service to Craigieburn railway station was opened on 30 September 2007, together with a new station at Roxburgh Park at Somerton Rd - Roxburgh Park railway station. 
Dead end in the north at Stockton Street.
Continues to the west as the Aitken Creek Trail via the Craigieburn Public Golf Course
Meets the Yuroke Creek Trail immediately to the south of Cassinia Crescent in Meadow Heights
And further south the Moonee Ponds Creek Trail.

References 

Bike rides around Melbourne 3rd edition, 2009, Julia Blunden, Open Spaces Publishing, 

Bike paths in Melbourne